Hypsogastropoda is a clade containing  marine gastropods within the clade Caenogastropoda. 

This clade is considered by the database WoRMS as an alternate representation 

This clade contains two clades and one informal group:
 Clade Littorinimorpha
 Informal group Ptenoglossa
  Clade Neogastropoda

References

 Ponder W.F. & Lindberg D.R. 1997. Towards a phylogeny of gastropod molluscs: an analysis using morphological characters. Zoological Journal of the Linnean Society, 119: 83-265.

External links 

 Murray-Darling Freshwater Research Centre. Hypsogastropoda

 
Taxa named by Winston Ponder